In UK politics, a parliamentary assistant is an unelected partisan member of staff employed by a Member of Parliament (MP) to assist them with their parliamentary duties. Parliamentary assistants usually work at the House of Commons in the UK Parliament or in their MP's constituency office.

Duties
The duties of parliamentary assistants vary significantly depending on the MPs they work for and their position in Parliament; but generally they facilitate the day-to-day working life of their MP and make it as efficient as possible. The office in which a parliamentary assistant is based may determine the type of work they do.

Alternative titles and pay
MPs may distinguish between parliamentary assistants in terms of seniority. For example, some MPs differentiate between parliamentary assistants and senior parliamentary assistants. Parliamentary assistants may also be called parliamentary researchers if they are principally tasked with conducting research. 

Salaries for MPs' staff are set by the MP they work for, but must be within the bounds of the pay scales set by the Independent Parliamentary Standards Authority.

Controversies
In recent years, there has been controversy over the tradition of MPs hiring their family members as parliamentary assistants. In 2017, it was revealed that one in five MPs employed a member of their family, despite the practice being banned for new MPs before the 2017 general election.

See also 

 Downing Street Chief of Staff
 Parliamentary secretary
 Permanent secretary
 Private Secretary

References

Politics of the United Kingdom